Coralliozetus springeri is a species of chaenopsid blenny found in coral reefs from Costa Rica to Ecuador in the eastern central Pacific ocean. It can reach a maximum length of  TL. This species feeds primarily on zooplankton. The specific name honours the ichthyologist Victor G. Springer of the US National Museum.

References
 Stephens, J. S. Jr., E. S. Hobson, and R. K. Johnson 1966 (7 Sept.) Notes on distribution, behaviour, and morphological variation in some chaenopsid fishes from the tropical eastern Pacific, with descriptions of two new species, Acanthemblemaria castroi and Coralliozetus springeri. Copeia 1966 (no. 3): 424–438.

springeri
Fish described in 1966